Grebo is a Kru language of Liberia. All of the Grebo languages are referred to as Grebo, though in Ivory Coast, Krumen is the usual name. The Grebo people live in the extreme south-west of Liberia, both on the coast and inland, between the rivers Cavally and Cess.

As in the other Kru languages, tone is extremely important. For instance,  with a high (or high-mid) tone is the first-person pronoun "I", while  with a low tone is the singular form of "you".

References

External links

Grebo people
Grebo languages
Languages of Liberia